YAC may refer to:

Yeast artificial chromosome
Youth advisory council
York Against Cancer
Yards after catch, a statistic in American football
The Yale Alley Cats, an all-male a cappella group
The IATA code for Cat Lake Airport

See also
 Yak (disambiguation)